Live at Roadburn may refer to:

 Live at Roadburn (Earthless album)
 Live at Roadburn (Ulver album),